Lieutenant-General Sir Reginald Pole-Carew,  (1 May 1849 – 19 September 1924) was a British Army officer who became General Officer Commanding 8th Division.

Background and family
Pole-Carew was the son of William Pole-Carew (1811–1888) by his wife Frances Anne Buller (d.1902), daughter of John Buller. His father was a descendant of the Pole baronets, of Shute, and served as Member of Parliament for East Cornwall.

Military career
Pole-Carew was commissioned into the Coldstream Guards in 1869. He served as a staff officer with Lord Roberts in the Second Anglo-Afghan War in 1878 and again served with him during the Second Boer War of 1899–1902. He was promoted to the substantive rank of colonel on 27 November 1899, and at the same time appointed in command of the 9th Brigade with the local rank of major-general. As such he was in command of the brigade during the Battle of Modder River on 28 November 1899. In February 1900 he was appointed in command of the Guards Brigade, shortly before the Relief of Kimberley. He later commanded the 11th Division of the South Africa Field Force, before becoming General Officer Commanding 8th Division in Southern Ireland in 1903.

Political career
Pole-Carew was Liberal Unionist Member of Parliament for Bodmin from 1910 to 1916. In 1911, he was appointed a deputy lieutenant of Cornwall. He lived at Antony House in Cornwall.

Family
On 19 February 1901 Pole-Carew married Lady Beatrice Frances Elizabeth Butler, daughter of James Butler, 3rd Marquess of Ormonde, in the Guards Chapel, Knightsbridge. They had two sons, the elder of whom was Sir John Carew Pole, 12th Baronet, and two daughters.

Decorations
 Knight Commander of the Order of the Bath – 29 November 1900, in recognition of services in connection with the Campaign in South Africa 1899–1900 
 Companion of the Order of the Bath – 25 November 1887
 Commander of the Royal Victorian Order – 8 March 1901

References

 

|-

1849 births
1924 deaths
British Army generals
British Army personnel of the Second Boer War
British military personnel of the Second Anglo-Afghan War
Coldstream Guards officers
Commanders of the Royal Victorian Order
Conservative Party (UK) MPs for English constituencies
Deputy Lieutenants of Cornwall
Knights Commander of the Order of the Bath
Liberal Unionist Party MPs for English constituencies
Members of the Parliament of the United Kingdom for Bodmin
UK MPs 1910–1918